

List of Ambassadors

Moshe Kimhi, 2017–present
Itzhak Carmel-Kagan, 2015–2017
Shemi Tzur, 2013–2015
Ehud Gol (Non-Resident, Jerusalem), 2007–2008 
David Granit (Non-Resident, Ankara), 1995

References

Turkmenistan
Israel